David Arbuckle (born 12 August 1973) is a Scottish retired football midfielder who made over 100 appearances in the Scottish League for Queen's Park.

Honours 
Arbroath
 Scottish League Second Division second-place promotion: 2000–01

References

External links 

Scottish footballers
Scottish Football League players
Queen's Park F.C. players
Association football midfielders
1973 births
Footballers from Bellshill
Rutherglen Glencairn F.C. players
Arbroath F.C. players
Shotts Bon Accord F.C. players
Living people